The 2016 season for the BMC Racing Team began in January with the Tour Down Under. As a UCI WorldTeam, they were automatically invited and obligated to send a squad to every event in the UCI World Tour.

Team roster

Riders who joined the team for the 2016 season

Riders who left the team during or after the 2015 season

Season victories

National, Continental and World champions 2016

Footnotes

References

External links
 

2016 road cycling season by team
CCC Pro Team
2016 in American sports